Switzerland competed at the 1998 Winter Olympics in Nagano, Japan.

Medalists

Alpine skiing

Men

Men's combined

Women

Women's combined

Biathlon

Men

 1 A penalty loop of 150 metres had to be skied per missed target.
 2 One minute added per missed target.

Bobsleigh

Cross-country skiing

Men

 1 Starting delay based on 10 km results. 
 C = Classical style, F = Freestyle

Men's 4 × 10 km relay

Women

 2 Starting delay based on 5 km results. 
 C = Classical style, F = Freestyle

Women's 4 × 5 km relay

Curling

Men's tournament

Group stage

|}

Medal round
Semi-final

Gold medal game

Figure skating

Men

Freestyle skiing

Women

Luge

Men

Nordic combined 

Men's individual

Events:
 normal hill ski jumping
 15 km cross-country skiing 

Men's Team

Four participants per team.

Events:
 normal hill ski jumping
 5 km cross-country skiing

Ski jumping 

Men's team large hill

 1 Four teams members performed two jumps each.

Snowboarding

Men's giant slalom

Men's halfpipe

Women's giant slalom

Women's halfpipe

Speed skating

Men

References
Official Olympic Reports
International Olympic Committee results database
 Olympic Winter Games 1998, full results by sports-reference.com

Nations at the 1998 Winter Olympics
1998
1998 in Swiss sport